This aspires to be a complete list of compositions by Béla Bartók. The catalogue numbering by András Szőllősy (Sz.), László Somfai (BB) and Denijs Dille (DD) are provided, as well as Bartók's own opus numbers.  Note that Bartók started three times anew with opus numbers, here indicated with "(list 1)", "(list 2)" and "(list 3)" respectively. The pieces from the third listing are by far best known; opus lists 1 and 2 are early works. The year of composition and instrumentation (including voice) are included. See the main article on Béla Bartók for more details.

Sortable list by four catalogue numberings, year of composition and instrumentation

List by type of composition

This is a near complete list of compositions by Béla Bartók. Both the more common
András Szöllősy catalogue numbering (Sz.) and the more recent László Somfai catalogue number (BB.) are provided. Where compositions do not have a Sz. numbering, the intermediate Denijs Dille catalogue numbering (DD.) has been provided. See the main article on Béla Bartók for more details.

This list does not include early compositions that have since been lost.

Stage works
 Bluebeard's Castle (1911, revised 1912 & 1917) Op. 11, Sz. 48, BB 62, opera
 The Wooden Prince (1914–16) Op. 13, Sz. 60, BB 74, ballet
 The Miraculous Mandarin (1918, 1919 completed 1926) Op. 19, Sz. 73, BB 82, ballet-pantomime

Orchestral works
 Scherzo in C major from Symphony in E flat major DD 68, BB 25
 Suite #1 for full orchestra (1905) Op. 3, Sz. 31, BB 39
 Suite #2 for small orchestra (1905–1907 revised 1943) Op. 4, Sz. 34, BB 40
 Two Pictures (1910) Op. 10, Sz. 46, BB 59
 Romanian Dance Sz. 47a, BB 61
 Four Pieces (1912) Op. 12, Sz. 51, BB 64
 Suite The Wooden Prince Op. 13, Sz. 60, BB 74
 Romanian Folk Dances for small orchestra (1917) Sz. 68, BB 76
 Suite The Miraculous Mandarin Op. 19, Sz. 73, BB 82
 Kossuth, Symphonic Poem Sz. 75a, BB 31
 Dance Suite (Táncszvit) (1923) Sz. 77, BB 86
 Transylvanian Dances Sz. 96, BB 102b
 Hungarian Pictures (1931) Sz. 97, BB 103
 Hungarian Peasant Songs Sz. 100, BB 107
 Music for Strings, Percussion and Celesta (1936) Sz. 106, BB 114
 Divertimento (1939) Sz. 113, BB 118
 Concerto for Orchestra (1942–43, revised 1945) Sz. 116, BB 123

Concertante works
Piano
Rhapsody for Piano and Orchestra Op. 1, Sz. 27, BB 36b
Scherzo Burlesque for Piano and Orchestra Op. 2, Sz. 28, BB 35
Piano Concerto No. 1 (1926) Sz. 83, BB 91
Piano Concerto No. 2 (1930-31) Sz. 95, BB 101
Piano Concerto No. 3 (1945) Sz. 119, BB 127
Violin
Violin Concerto No. 1 (1907–1908, 1st pub 1956) Op. posth., Sz. 36, BB 48a
 Two Portraits for Violin and Orchestra (1907, 1908) Op. 5, Sz. 37, BB 48b
Rhapsody Folk Dances for Violin and Orchestra No. 1 (1928–29) Sz. 87, BB 94
Rhapsody Folk Dances for Violin and Orchestra No. 2 (1928, rev. 1935) Sz. 90, BB 96
Violin Concerto No. 2 (1937–38) Sz. 112, BB 117
Viola
Viola Concerto (completed by Tibor Serly and also arr. for cello) (1945) Sz. 120, BB 128
Other
Concerto for Two Pianos, Percussion and Orchestra (1943, arrangement of Sonata for Two Pianos and Percussion)

Choral works
 With Orchestral Accompaniment
 3 Village Scenes Falun Sz. 79, BB 87b
 5 Hungarian Folksongs Sz. 101, BB 108
 7 Choruses with Orchestral Accompaniment, selected and arr. from Sz. 103, BB 111
 Cantata Profana (The Nine Enchanted Stags) (1930) Sz. 94, BB 100
 Without Orchestral Accompaniment
 4 Old Hungarian folksongs Sz. 50, BB 60
 4 Slovak Folksongs Sz. 70, BB 78
 27 Two-part & Three-part Choruses Sz. 103, BB 111
 Evening DD 74, BB 30
 From Olden Times (3), BB 112 (1935)
 Hungarian Folksongs Sz. 93, BB 99
 5 Slovak Folksongs Sz. 69, BB 77
 Székely Songs Sz. 99, BB 106

Chamber works

 44 Duos for Two Violins Sz. 98, BB 104
 Andante in A major DD 70, BB 26
 Contrasts for clarinet, violin, and piano (1938) Sz. 111, BB 116
 Piano Quartet in C minor (1898) Op. 20, Sz. 9, BB 13, DD 52
 Piano Quintet (1903–04) DD 77, BB 33 (An earlier piano quintet, also in C major, composed in 1897, is lost.)
 Rhapsody No. 1 for violin and piano (1928) Sz. 86, BB 94
 Rhapsody No. 2 for violin and piano (1929) Sz. 89, BB 96
 Rhapsody for cello and piano Sz. 86, BB 94 (transcription by Bartók of Rhapsody for Violin and Piano No. 1)
 Sonata for Two Pianos and Percussion Sz. 110, BB 115
 Sonata in E minor for violin and piano DD 72, BB 28
 Sonata No. 1 for violin and piano (1921) Op. 21 Sz. 75, BB 84
 Sonata No. 2 for violin and piano (1922) Sz. 76, BB 85
 Seven Pieces from Mikrokosmos (for two pianos) Sz. 108, BB 120
 Sonata for Solo Violin Sz. 117, BB 124
 Suite Op. 4b (arranged for two pianos), Sz. 115a, BB 122
 String Quartets
 String Quartet No. 1 Op. 7, Sz. 40, BB 52
 String Quartet No. 2 Op. 17, Sz. 67, BB 75
 String Quartet No. 3 Sz. 85, BB 93
 String Quartet No. 4 Sz. 91, BB 95
 String Quartet No. 5 Sz. 102, BB 110
 String Quartet No. 6 Sz. 114, BB 119

Piano works
 2 Elegies Op. 8b, Sz. 41, BB 49
 2 Romanian Folk Dances (1910) Op. 8a, Sz. 43, BB 56
 3 Hungarian Folksongs from the Csík District Sz. 35a, BB 45/b
 3 Burlesques Op. 8c, Sz. 47, BB 55
 3 Hungarian Folk Tunes, Sz. 66, BB 80b
 3 Studies Op. 18, Sz. 72, BB 81
 3 Rondos on Slovak Folk Tunes Sz. 84, BB 92
 4 Dirges, Op. 9a, Sz. 45, BB 58
 4 Pieces DD 71, BB 27
 6 Romanian Folk Dances
 7 Sketches Op. 9b, Sz. 44, BB 54
 8 Improvisations on Hungarian Peasant Songs (1920) Op. 20, Sz. 74, BB 83
 9 Little Piano Pieces Sz. 82, BB 90
 10 Easy Pieces (1908) Sz. 39, BB 51
 14 Bagatelles (1908) Op. 6, Sz. 38, BB 50
 15 Hungarian Peasant Songs, Sz. 71, BB 79
 Allegro barbaro (1911) Sz. 49, BB 63
 Dance Suite, Sz. 77, BB 86b
 For Children Sz. 42, BB 53, [Books 1 & 2] Vol.1-4
 Marche funebre Sz. 75b, BB 31
 Mikrokosmos (1926, 1932–39) Sz. 107, BB 105
 includes the 6 Dances in Bulgarian Rhythm dedicated to Harriet Cohen
 Out of Doors (1926) Sz. 81, BB 89
 Petite Suite Sz. 105, BB 113
 Petits Morceaux DD 67/1, BB 38
 Rhapsody, Op. 1, Sz. 26, BB 36a
 Romanian Folk Dances (1915) Sz. 56, BB 68
 Romanian Christmas Carols (1915) Sz. 57, BB 67
 Scherzo oder Fantasie Op. 18, DD 50, BB 11
 Slovakian Dance (1923)
 Sonata (1926) Sz. 80, BB 88
 Sonatina (1915) Sz. 55, BB 69
 Suite, Op. 14, (1916) Sz. 62, BB 70
 The First Term at the Piano Sz. 52-53, BB 67

There are also piano works that are from Bartók's first and second set of opus numbers. Some are lost, some have been published and are listed above, and some are not and are unpublished.

Songs
 2 Hungarian Folksongs Sz. 33b, BB 44
 4 Slovakian Folksongs Sz. 35b, BB 46
 4 Songs included in Mikrokosmos Sz. 107, BB 105
 5 Songs on poems by Endre Ady Op. 16, Sz. 63, BB 72
 5 Songs on poems by Klára Gombossy and Wanda Gleiman Op. 15, Sz. 61, BB 71 (original with piano accompaniment, later also arranged by Zoltán Kodály for orchestral accompaniment)
 Eight Hungarian Folksongs Sz. 64, BB 47
 Twenty Hungarian Folksongs Sz. 92, BB 98
 Székely Folksong Piros Alma... Sz. 30, BB 34
 From Gyergyó Sz. 35, BB 45a
 Hungarian Folksong Sz. 109, BB deest
 Hungarian Folksongs #1–10 Sz. 33, BB 42 (revised in 1928 as Five Hungarian Folksongs, Sz. 33, BB 97)
 Hungarian Folksongs #11–20 Sz. 33a, BB 43
 Village Scenes Falun Sz. 78, BB 87a

Arrangements by others
 Suite paysanne hongroise (arranged by Paul Arma, for a flute and piano or orchestra)
 Rumanian Folk Dances (arranged by Frederick Charlton for The Hutchins Consort)
 Allegro barbaro'' arranged by Jenő Kenessey for orchestra (1946)
 Sonata for Synthesizer (Piano Sonata arranged by b schmidt for electronic music synthesizers)
 Omni Suite (Suite for Piano arranged by b Schmidt for electronic music synthesizers)

References

 
Bartok, Bela